Sturgeon Lake is a lake in the Kenora and Thunder Bay districts in northwestern Ontario, Canada. The lake has many bays and arms, and is drained by the Sturgeon River. Savant Lake (Sturgeon Lake) Water Aerodrome is located on the lake.

See also
List of lakes in Ontario

References
Atlas of Canada topographic map 52J4 retrieved 2007-11-11
The Official Road Map of Ontario on-line section 13 retrieved 2007-11-11

Lakes of Kenora District
Lakes of Thunder Bay District
Hudson's Bay Company trading posts